Davina Marcia Herbert Ingrams, 18th Baroness Darcy de Knayth  (10 July 1938 – 24 February 2008) was a crossbench member of the House of Lords, continuing to sit after the passing of the House of Lords Act 1999 as an elected peer.

Biography

Ingrams was the daughter of Mervyn Herbert, 17th Baron Darcy de Knayth (also known as Viscount Clive, his courtesy title as son of the Earl of Powis); and his wife Vida, née Cuthbert. The barony had been created in 1332 for John Darcy, and revived twice after falling into abeyance. Through her grandfather, George Herbert, 4th Earl of Powis, she was descended from Robert Clive, 1st Baron Clive. She inherited the barony in 1943, when her father was killed in action during the Second World War, flying a Mosquito as a squadron leader in the RAF.

In 1946, the widowed Lady Clive remarried, to Brigadier Derek Schreiber, Chief of Staff to the Governor General of Australia: Lady Darcy de Knayth acted as flower girl.

Lady Darcy de Knayth was educated at St Mary's School, Wantage, and later in Florence and the Sorbonne.

Career
She and her husband were involved in a serious accident in 1964, returning from a dance, when their car hit a tree. Her husband was killed outright, and she was paralysed from the neck down. She was treated at Stoke Mandeville Hospital, and later recovered some movement in her upper body. She became a wheelchair user and took up table tennis and archery. She won a gold medal in swimming at the 1968 Summer Paralympics in Israel, and a bronze for table tennis at the 1972 Games in West Germany.

She was one of the first 16 hereditary peeresses admitted to the House of Lords in 1963, and spoke frequently on disability matters after taking up her seat in 1969. She was made a dame (DBE) for her services to disabled people in 1996.

After the House of Lords Act 1999 removed most of the hereditary peers from the House of Lords, she was selected as one of the select representative peers, coming top of the ballot of crossbench peers.

Personal life
She married publisher Rupert Ingrams (brother of the Private Eye editor Richard Ingrams) in 1960. They had three children.

She died on 24 February 2008, aged 69, of undisclosed causes. She was survived by her son and two daughters. Her son, Caspar, succeeded as the 19th Baron Darcy de Knayth. The day after Lady Darcy's death, the House of Lords paid her warm tribute when it passed the third reading of the Disabled Persons (Independent Living) Bill.

References

External links
Profile, thepeerage.com; accessed 12 November 2014. 
Profile, chivalricorders.org; accessed 12 November 2014.
House of Lords: Members deceased, parliament.uk; accessed 12 November 2014.
 

1938 births
2008 deaths
Dames Commander of the Order of the British Empire
British disability rights activists
Swimmers at the 1968 Summer Paralympics
Table tennis players at the 1972 Summer Paralympics
Paralympic swimmers of Great Britain
Paralympic table tennis players of Great Britain
Paralympic gold medalists for Great Britain
Paralympic bronze medalists for Great Britain
Royalty and nobility with disabilities
Wheelchair category Paralympic competitors
Hereditary women peers
British politicians with disabilities
People educated at St Mary’s School, Wantage
People educated at Heathfield School, Ascot
English people with disabilities
Crossbench hereditary peers
Medalists at the 1968 Summer Paralympics
Medalists at the 1972 Summer Paralympics
Place of birth missing
Place of death missing
British female swimmers
20th-century British women politicians
Davina
Barons Darcy de Knayth
Paralympic medalists in swimming
Paralympic medalists in table tennis
People with tetraplegia
20th-century English nobility
Hereditary peers elected under the House of Lords Act 1999